The Frankfurt Constitution (FRV) or Constitution of St. Paul's Church (Paulskirchenverfassung), officially named the Constitution of the German Empire (Verfassung des Deutschen Reiches) of 28 March 1849, was an unsuccessful attempt to create a unified German nation state in the successor states of the Holy Roman Empire organised in the German Confederation. Adopted and proclaimed by the Frankfurt Parliament after the Revolutions of 1848, the constitution contained a charter of fundamental rights and a democratic government in the form of a constitutional monarchy. King Frederick William IV of Prussia was designated head of state as "Emperor of the Germans" (Kaiser der Deutschen), a role he rejected.

The constitution is called by its more common names in order to distinguish it from the Constitution of the German Empire enacted in 1871 and initiated by Otto von Bismarck.

Emergence
The 1849 Constitution was proclaimed by the Frankfurt Parliament, during its meeting in the Paulskirche church on 27 March 1849, and came in effect on 28 March, when it was published in the Reichs-Gesetz-Blatt 1849, pp. 101–147.  Thus, a united German Empire, as successor to the German Confederation, had been founded de jure. De facto, however, most Princes on German soil were not willing to give up sovereignty and resisted it, so it did not succeed on land, with the German Confederation being restored a year later. On the other hand, this first and democratic German Empire, with its small Reichsflotte (Imperial Fleet) founded a year earlier, fought the First War of Schleswig at sea with the Battle of Heligoland. The fleet's black-red-gold war ensign was one of the first instances of the official use of the modern republican Flag of Germany.

After long and controversial negotiations, the parliament had passed the complete Imperial Constitution on 27 March 1849. It was carried narrowly, by 267 against 263 votes. The version passed included the creation of a hereditary emperor (Erbkaisertum), which had been favoured mainly by the erbkaiserliche group around Gagern, with the reluctant support of the Westendhall group around Heinrich Simon. On the first reading, such a solution had been dismissed. The change of mind came about because all alternative suggestions, such as an elective monarchy, or a Directory government under an alternating chair were even less practicable and unable to find broad support, as was the radical left's demand for a republic, modelled on the United States.

The constitution's text opens with § 1 Sentence 1: "Das deutsche Reich besteht aus dem Gebiete des bisherigen deutschen Bundes." ("The German Empire consists of the area of the hitherto existing German Confederation"). The Frankfurt deputies had to answer the German question, i.e. the debate whether a unified Germany should comprise those Austrian crown lands included in the Confederation's territory or not. As the Habsburg emperors would never renounce any constituent lands of their multinational state, the delegates with the designation of King Frederick William IV opted for a Prussian-led "Lesser German solution" (Kleindeutsche Lösung), though the Constitution explicitly reserved the participation of the Austrian lands.

The German people were to be represented by a bicameral parliament, with a directly elected Volkshaus (House of commons), and a Staatenhaus (House of States) of representatives sent by the individual confederated states. Half of each Staatenhaus delegation was to be appointed by the respective state government, the other by the state parliament. Sections 178 and 179 called, at one and the same time, for public trials, oral criminal proceedings, and jury trials for the "more serious crimes and all political offenses." The introduction of the jury trial was followed by its adoption by the overwhelming majority of German states, and continued with the German Empire Gerichtsverfassungsgesetz (GVG) of 27 January 1877, and would last until the Emminger Reform of 4 January 1924 during the Weimar Republic.

See also 
 Basic Law for the Federal Republic of Germany

References

Further reading
 Jörg-Detlef Kühne: Die Reichsverfassung der Paulskirche. Neuwied 1998, .
 Karl Binding: Der Versuch der Reichsgründung durch die Paulskirche. Schutterwald/Baden 1998,

External links
 Originaltext der Verfassung des Deutschen Reichs ("Paulskirchenverfassung") vom 28. März 1849 (auf documentArchiv.de)
 Verfassung des Deutschen Reiches ("Paulskirchen-Verfassung") vom 28.03.1849 in Volltext

1849 in Germany
Frankfurt Parliament
German revolutions of 1848–1849
1849 in politics
1849 in law
1849 documents
Historical constitutions of Germany